Mamadou Diaw (born 2 January 2001) is a Senegalese football midfielder.

He travelled to Ålesund in the early spring of 2020 for a two or three week trial at Aalesunds FK. The subsequent COVID-19-related lockdown closed the opportunity for Diaw to return to Senegal. He was accepted as a student at Ålesund Folk High School and continued training. Aalesund eventually desired to sign him, and finally cleared the paperwork in October 2020.

Diaw made his Eliteserien debut in October 2020 against Haugesund, one of few games Aalesund managed to win. Following relegation he became a semi-regular in the 2021 1. divisjon, and scored his first goal in the 2021 Norwegian Football Cup against Ranheim.

References

2001 births
Living people
Senegalese footballers
Aalesunds FK players
Eliteserien players
Norwegian First Division players
Senegalese expatriate footballers
Expatriate footballers in Norway
Senegalese expatriate sportspeople in Norway
Association football midfielders